The 2017 Dubai Tennis Championships (also known as the 2017 Dubai Duty Free Tennis Championships for sponsorship reasons) was an ATP 500 event on the 2017 ATP World Tour and a WTA Premier 5 on the 2017 WTA Tour. Both events were held at the Aviation Club Tennis Centre in Dubai, United Arab Emirates. The women's tournament took place from February 20 to 26, 2017 while the men's tournament took place from February 27 through March 4, 2017.

Points and prize money

Point distribution

Prize money

*per team

ATP singles main-draw entrants

Seeds 

 Rankings are as of February 20, 2017.

Other entrants
The following players received wildcards into the singles main draw:
  Omar Alawadhi
  Roberto Bautista Agut
  Mohamed Safwat

The following players received entry from the qualifying draw:
  Marius Copil
  Evgeny Donskoy
  Denis Istomin
  Lukáš Rosol

The following player received entry as a lucky loser:
  Andreas Seppi

Withdrawals
Before the tournament
  Marcos Baghdatis → replaced by  Guillermo García López
  Florian Mayer → replaced by  Andreas Seppi

Retirements
  Lukáš Rosol (left leg injury)

ATP doubles main-draw entrants

Seeds 

 Rankings are as of February 20, 2017.

Other entrants
The following pairs received wildcards into the doubles main draw:
  Omar Alawadhi /  Amirvala Madanchi
  James McGee /  David O'Hare

The following pair received entry from the qualifying draw:
  James Cerretani /  Philipp Oswald

Withdrawals
During the tournament
  Lucas Pouille (bicep strain)

WTA singles main-draw entrants

Seeds 

 Rankings were as of February 13, 2017.

Other entrants
The following players received wildcards into the singles main draw:
  Mona Barthel
  Çağla Büyükakçay
  Peng Shuai

The following players received entry from the qualifying draw:
  Chang Kai-chen
  Ons Jabeur
  Elise Mertens
  Aryna Sabalenka
  Sílvia Soler Espinosa
  Zhang Kailin
  Zheng Saisai
  Zhu Lin

The following player received entry as a lucky loser:
  Mandy Minella

Withdrawals
 Timea Bacsinszky → replaced by  Catherine Bellis
 Eugenie Bouchard → replaced by  Kristýna Plíšková
 Louisa Chirico → replaced by  Madison Brengle
 Alizé Cornet → replaced by  Lara Arruabarrena
 Sara Errani → replaced by  Lesia Tsurenko
 Simona Halep → replaced by  Jelena Janković
 Johanna Konta → replaced by  Mandy Minella
 Karin Knapp → replaced by  Johanna Larsson
 Svetlana Kuznetsova → replaced by  Viktorija Golubic
 Monica Niculescu → replaced by  Wang Qiang
 Carla Suárez Navarro → replaced by  Tsvetana Pironkova

WTA doubles main-draw entrants

Seeds 

 Rankings were as of February 13, 2017.

Other entrants
The following pair received a wildcard into the doubles main draw:
  Fatma Al-Nabhani /  Mona Barthel

Champions

Men's singles

  Andy Murray def.  Fernando Verdasco, 6–3, 6–2

Women's singles

   Elina Svitolina def.  Caroline Wozniacki, 6–4, 6–2

Men's doubles

  Jean-Julien Rojer /  Horia Tecău def.  Rohan Bopanna /  Marcin Matkowski, 4–6, 6–3, [10–3]

Women's doubles

  Ekaterina Makarova /  Elena Vesnina def.  Andrea Hlaváčková /  Peng Shuai, 6–2, 4–6, [10–7]

References

External links
 Official website

 
2017